The 2017 Arkansas State Red Wolves football team represented Arkansas State University in the 2017 NCAA Division I FBS football season. The Red Wolves played their home games at Centennial Bank Stadium in Jonesboro, Arkansas, and competed in the Sun Belt Conference. They were led by fourth-year head coach Blake Anderson. They finished the season 7–5, 6–2 in Sun Belt play to finish in third place. They received a bid to the Camellia Bowl where they lost to Middle Tennessee.

Previous season 
The Red Wolves finished the 2016 season 8–5, 7–1 in Sun Belt play to earn a share of the Sun Belt championship. They received a bid to the Cure Bowl where they defeated UCF.

Schedule
Arkansas State announced its 2017 football schedule on March 1, 2017. The 2017 schedule consisted of six home and away games in the regular season. The Red Wolves hosted Sun Belt foes Coastal Carolina, Louisiana–Lafayette, Texas State, and Troy, and traveled to Georgia Southern, Louisiana–Monroe, New Mexico State, and South Alabama

The Red Wolves hosted two of the four non-conference opponents, Arkansas–Pine Bluff from the Southwestern Athletic Conference and Miami (FL) from the Atlantic Coast Conference, and traveled to Nebraska from the Big Ten Conference and SMU from the American Athletic Conference. 

The game between Arkansas State and Miami was canceled in the wake of Hurricane Irma due to travel concerns for the Hurricanes.
Schedule Source:

Game summaries

at Nebraska

Arkansas–Pine Bluff

at SMU

at Georgia Southern

Coastal Carolina

Louisiana–Lafayette

at New Mexico State

at South Alabama

Texas State

at Louisiana–Monroe

Troy

vs Middle Tennessee–Camellia Bowl

References

Arkansas State
Arkansas State Red Wolves football seasons
Arkansas State Red Wolves football